A dheki is an agricultural tool used for threshing, to separate rice grains from their outer husks, while leaving the bran layer, thus producing brown rice. Dhekis have generally fallen into disuse because of the availability of technologies such as combine harvesters that require much less physical labour. In earlier times a dheki was an important part of village life in Bangladesh and in parts of India, notably West Bengal, Jharkhand, Assam and Chhattisgarh. It was generally operated by two or three women.

At one end of the lever is a vertical wooden cylinder which functions as a pestle. It is raised by the lever, and that falls down by its own weight. The fulcrum of the lever is placed at five-eighths of the length of the lever from the pestle.

See also
 Mortar and pestle

References

Threshing tools